Buddy Holly is Alive and Well on Ganymede is a 1991 comedic science fiction novel by Bradley Denton. It won the 1992 John W. Campbell Memorial Award for Best Science Fiction Novel.

Plot
Oliver Vale was conceived on February 3, 1959, the day that iconic rock & roll singer Buddy Holly died. Exactly thirty years later, Buddy Holly appears on every television set in the world, on every channel. Holly states that he is being held on Ganymede, and that Oliver Vale is to be contacted for assistance. He then begins performing.

As a result, Vale finds himself being pursued by agents of the Federal Communications Commission, by angry television watchers, and by still more mysterious forces.

Adaptation
In August 2009, a film version of the novel was announced. It is to be titled Alive and Well and star Jon Heder. On April 11, 2011, a teaser trailer was released. The project was ultimately abandoned, primarily due to funding.

References

External links
Buddy Holly is Alive and Well on Ganymede at Manybooks.net

1991 American novels
American science fiction novels
John W. Campbell Award for Best Science Fiction Novel-winning works
Cultural depictions of Buddy Holly
Fiction set on Ganymede (moon)
Fiction set in 1989
Works by Bradley Denton